Duke Wen may refer to these rulers from ancient China:

Duke of Zhou ( 11th century BC)
Duke Wen of Qi (died 804 BC)
Duke Wen of Chen (died 745 BC)
Duke Wen of Qin (died 716 BC)
Duke Wen of Jin (697–628 BC)
Duke Wen of Eastern Zhou (died 249 BC)

See also
Marquess Wen (disambiguation)